Walter Cameron Nichol (October 15, 1866 – December 19, 1928) was a Canadian journalist, newspaper editor and publisher, and the 12th Lieutenant Governor of British Columbia.

References
 

1866 births
1928 deaths
Lieutenant Governors of British Columbia